Absi al-Taha, better known by his nom de guerre Abu Omar al-Idlibi, is a Syrian military leader who is a commander of the Northern Democratic Brigade of the Syrian Democratic Forces, leading the group in the Raqqa Governorate.

Pre-war
Prior to the Syrian Civil War, Abu Omar al-Idlibi worked as a construction developer.

Syrian Civil War
With the start of the Syrian Civil War in 2011, al-Idlibi was conscripted into the Syrian Arab Army to lead a tank platoon as a second lieutenant. He and his unit defected to the Free Syrian Army when his village in the Idlib Governorate was attacked.

In July 2014, al-Idlibi accused the al-Nusra Front of committing massacres in the Darkush area of western Idlib, citing the killing and beheading of a FSA fighter by al-Nusra fighters in the village of al-Ghafir.

In August 2017, Hayat Tahrir al-Sham executed Osama al-Khader, commander of the Decisive Storm Brigade of the 21st Combined Forces, on charges including collaboration with al-Idlibi to conduct espionage and sabotage against HTS and other groups in Idlib.

The human rights group Syrians for Truth and Justice reported that the Northern Democratic Brigade confiscated dozens of deserted and unused houses in Raqqa from February 2020. When some owners returned to the city to request the return of their properties to reclaim or sell them, Abu Omar al-Idlibi and the unit refused to return the houses, citing their previous non-usage and the need to provide a place to live for the brigade's families.

References

Members of the Free Syrian Army
People from Idlib Governorate
Living people
Year of birth missing (living people)